(Parliamentary) Committee on Environment and Agriculture (MJU) is a parliamentary committee in the Swedish Riksdag. The committee's main areas of responsibility are the Swedish agricultural industry, agriculture, forestry, policies surrounding gardening, hunting, fishing, and weather forecasting. The committee also handles other matters such as the safety of nuclear power, nature conservation, and environmental protection, along with other matters that do not concern any other of the seventeen committees. Before the 1998/1999 opening of the Riksdag, was the name of the committee Jordbruksutskottet (Committee on Agriculture)

The committee's Speaker is Emma Nohrén, from the Green Party, and the vice-Speaker is Kjell-Arne Ottosson from the Christian Democrats.

History 
The Committee on Agriculture was created in 1909 after the decision of the king and the Riksdag, and took over the tasks that were given to the State Committee and the Law Committee. During the time that Sweden was a bicameral state, there were 16 members of parliament serving in the committee from both chambers. The first meeting of the committee was in 1910.

List of speakers for the committee

List of vice-speakers for the committee

References

External links 
Riksdagen - Miljö- och jordbruksutskottet

Committees of the Riksdag